Out of the Black is the debut extended play by British rock duo Royal Blood. The four-track EP, self-produced by the band with Tom Dalgety, was released by Black Mammoth and Warner Bros. Records on 11 March 2014 in the United States. The EP marks the major label debut by the band, having signed with Warner Bros. earlier in the year. The first three songs appeared on their debut album that was released later that year. "Hole" was later released as a B-side to the single "Little Monster".

Track listing

Personnel
Partly adapted from Out of the Black liner notes.

Royal Blood
Mike Kerr – lead vocals, bass guitar
Ben Thatcher – drums

Technical personnel
Tom Dalgety – producer, mixing (track 1), recording
John Davis – mastering
Alan Moulder – mixing (track 3)
Dave Sardy – mixing (track 2)

Release history

References

External links 
 
Royal Blood official website

2014 debut EPs
Warner Records EPs
Royal Blood (band) albums
Albums recorded at Rockfield Studios